Puffy's Saga is a maze video game released in 1989.

References

External links
Puffy's Saga at Atari Mania
Puffy's Saga at Gamebase 64
Puffy's Saga at Spectrum Computing

1989 video games
Amiga games
Amstrad CPC games
Atari ST games
Commodore 64 games
ZX Spectrum games
Video games developed in France